Marion Santos Andres (born July 25, 1958) is a Filipino politician and physician who served as vice mayor of Marikina since 2019, a post that he previously held from 2001 to 2010. Prior to his election as vice mayor, he also served as councilor of Marikina from 1992 to 2001. He is the son of former Marikina vice mayor, Jose Andres. He took his grade school and high school education from Marist School - Marikina. He graduated as a physician from the medical school of Lyceum-Northwestern University in Dagupan. He also unsuccessfully ran for mayor in 2010 and for vice mayor in 2013.

References

External links
Marikina Website
Official website of Marion Andres

|-

Living people
1958 births
People from Marikina
Politicians from Metro Manila
Bagumbayan–VNP politicians
Lyceum of the Philippines University alumni